Diego Josué Madrigal Ulloa (born 19 March 1989 in San José, Costa Rica) is a Costa Rican footballer who plays for Sporting San Jose in the Liga FPD. Madrigal was a member of Costa Rica's under-20 team that finished fourt at the 2009 FIFA U-20 World Cup in Egypt.

Career
Madrigal made his Primera debut for UCR in January 2009 and scored his first Primera goal in March of that year. After leaving a good image at the 2009 FIFA U-20 World Cup, Euro Data Marketing, which represented Madrigal, intended transferring him to European football, ultimately signing for Sport Heredino. At UCR, Madrigal disputed 23 games and noted 4 goals.

Cerro Porteño
In December 2010, it was announced that Madrigal was Cerro Porteño's new striker. Madrigal signed for one year. In Madrigal's team was Jonathan Fabbro, Fredy Bareiro, Roberto Nanni, Javier Villarreal, Juan Manuel Lucero, Julio dos Santos, Rodrigo Burgos, Mathías Corujo, Luis Nuñez and Diego Barreto. In January 2010, Madrigal was expected to play in a friendly match for Cerro Porteño against Atlético Paranaense's B Team. Madrigal was usually a substitute in Cerro Porteño's team. On 13 February 2011, Madrigal made his first league appearance for Cerro Porteño in a 2–2 draw against Rubio Ñu, when he was substituted onto the field for Ivan Torres in the 55th minute. Whilst at Cerro Porteño, his national team selected him for the 2011 Copa América squad. In June 2011, Madrigal was associated with a move to Deportivo Saprissa.

Herediano
In August 2011, he returned to his former club Herediano.

Santos de Guápiles
In August 2012, he joined Santos de Guápiles.

Inter Baku
In January 2014, Madrigal signed for Azerbaijan Premier League side Inter Baku on a two-year contract.

Belén
In September 2015, Madrigal returned to Costa Rica, signing with Belén

Sporting San José
For the 2020/21 season, Madrigal joined Sporting San José.

International career
Madrigal played for the Costa Rica national football team at the 2009 FIFA U-20 World Cup in Egypt, where the team finished in fourth place. On 26 January 2010, Madrigal made his first appearance and scored his first goal for the senior side in a friendly match against Argentina. In May 2011, Madrigal scored in a victory for Costa Rica against Nigeria. In 2011, Madrigal was selected for the 2011 Copa América in Argentina.

Personal life
When Madrigal played in Thailand, he frequently visited the beaches. He desires to conclude his career in Public Administration, which he began when he played at Universidad de Costa Rica.

Career statistics

Club

International

Statistics accurate as of match played 27 February 2012

International goals

References

External links
 

1989 births
Living people
Footballers from San José, Costa Rica
Association football midfielders
Costa Rican footballers
Costa Rica international footballers
2011 CONCACAF Gold Cup players
2011 Copa América players
C.F. Universidad de Costa Rica footballers
C.S. Herediano footballers
Cerro Porteño players
Santos de Guápiles footballers
Deportivo Saprissa players
Shamakhi FK players
A.D. San Carlos footballers
Costa Rican expatriate footballers
Expatriate footballers in Paraguay
Expatriate footballers in Azerbaijan
2009 CONCACAF U-20 Championship players